Qua la mano (also known as Give me five) is a 1980 Italian comedy film directed by Pasquale Festa Campanile.

The film was a great commercial success, grossing over 11 billion lire; it was the first film to break through the wall of the ten billion at the Italian box office.

Cast 
 Adriano Celentano: Don Fulgenzio
 Enrico Montesano: Orazio Imperiali
 Lilli Carati: Rossana
 Philippe Leroy: the Pope
 Renzo Montagnani: Libero Battaglini
 Carlo Bagno: the Cardinal 
 Mario Carotenuto: the sailor
 Enzo Robutti: Benigno 
 Adriana Russo: Ersilia

References

External links

1980 films
Italian comedy films
1980 comedy films
Films directed by Pasquale Festa Campanile
Films scored by Detto Mariano
Films set in Rome
1980s Italian-language films
1980s Italian films